Halticus is a genus of fleahoppers in the family Miridae. There are at least 20 described species in the genus Halticus.

Species
These 20 species belong to the genus Halticus:

 Halticus apterus (Linnaeus, 1758)
 Halticus asperulus Horvath, 1898
 Halticus beganus Linnavuori, 1984
 Halticus bractatus (Say, 1832)
 Halticus chrysolepis Kirkaldy, 1904
 Halticus darbandikhanus Linnavuori, 1984
 Halticus darbandikhaus Linnavuori, 1984
 Halticus henschii Reuter, 1888
 Halticus insularis Usinger, 1946
 Halticus intermedius Uhler, 1904
 Halticus luteicollis (Panzer, 1804)
 Halticus macrocephalus Fieber, 1858
 Halticus major Wagner, 1951
 Halticus minutus Reuter, 1885
 Halticus obscurior Kerzhner & Muminov, 1974
 Halticus puncticollis Fieber, 1870
 Halticus pusillus (Herrich-Schaeffer, 1835)
 Halticus rugosus Reuter, 1894
 Halticus saltator (Geoffroy, 1785)
 Halticus tibialis Reuter, 1891

References

Further reading

External links

 

Miridae
Articles created by Qbugbot